Andreas Wengert (born 20 November 1944 is a sailor from Brazil, who represented his country at the 1976 Summer Olympics in Kingston, Ontario, Canada as crew member in the Soling. With helmsman Gastão Brun and fellow crew member Vicente Brun, they took the 10th place.

Sources
 

Living people
1944 births
Sailors at the 1976 Summer Olympics – Soling
Olympic sailors of Brazil
Brazilian male sailors (sport)